After the Partition of India, during October–November 1947 in the Jammu region of the princely state of Jammu and Kashmir, many Muslims were massacred and others driven away to West Punjab. The killings were carried out by extremist Hindus and Sikhs, aided and abetted by the forces of Maharaja Hari Singh. The activists of the Rashtriya Swayamsevak Sangh (RSS) played a key role in planning and executing the riots. An estimated 20,000–100,000 Muslims were massacred. Subsequently, many non-Muslims were massacred by Pakistani tribesmen, in the Mirpur region of today's Pakistani administered Kashmir, and also in the Rajouri area of Jammu division.

Background 

At the time of the Partition of India in 1947, the British abandoned their suzerainty over the princely states, which were left with the options of joining India or Pakistan or remaining independent. Hari Singh, the Maharaja of Jammu and Kashmir, the Maharaja indicated his preference to remain independent of the new dominions. All the major political groups of the state supported the Maharaja's decision, except for the Muslim Conference, which declared in favour of accession to Pakistan on 19 July 1947. The Muslim Conference was popular among Muslims in the Jammu province of the state, while the National Conference was popular in the Kashmir region.

With the support of Mian Iftikharuddin, Muslim Conference leader Sardar Ibrahim met Pakistan Colonel Akbar Khan for the 1947 Poonch Rebellion. Sardar Ibrahim requested and received arms for the rebels. Establishing a base in Murree in Pakistan Punjab, arms and ammunition were attempted to be purchased in NWFP which were to be smuggled into Jammu and Kashmir. Meanwhile, the Maharaja was informed of 400 armed Muslims who had infiltrated from Kahuta for the purpose of terrorising Hindu and Sikh minorities. Pakistan was informed and urged to control the infiltration. 

On 12 September 1947, then prime minister and defense minister of Pakistan Liaquat Ali Khan approved two plans for an invasion of Kashmir prepared by Colonel Akbar Khan and Sardar Shaukat Hayat Khan. Pashtun tribes were mobilized for an armed attack.

Roughly 100,000 Muslims and non-Muslims from East Punjab and West Punjab respectively were safely escorted through Jammu by Jammu and Kashmir State Forces.

Violence against Jammu Muslims 

Unlike the Kashmir valley which remained mostly calm during this transition period, the Jammu province which was contiguous to Punjab, experienced mass migration that led to violent inter-religious activity. Large numbers of Hindus and Sikhs from Rawalpindi and Sialkot started arriving since the March 1947 massacres in Rawalpindi, bringing "harrowing stories of Muslim atrocities in West Punjab". According to scholar Ilyas Chattha, this provoked counter-violence on Jammu Muslims, which had "many parallels with that in Sialkot". He writes, "the Kashmiri Muslims were to pay a heavy price in September–October 1947 for the earlier violence of West Punjab."

According to scholar Ian Copland, the administration's pogrom against its Muslim subjects in Jammu was undertaken partly out of revenge for the Poonch rebellion that started earlier.

Observers state that a main aim of Hari Singh and his administration was to alter the demographics of the region by eliminating the Muslim population, in order to ensure a Hindu majority in the region.

Scholar Ilyas Chattha and Jammu journalist Ved Bhasin blame the mishandling of law and order by Maharaja Hari Singh and his armed forces in Jammu, for the large scale communal violence in the region.

Massacres 
On 14 October, the RSS activists and the Akalis attacked various villages of Jammu district—Amrey, Cheak, Atmapur and Kochpura—and after killing some Muslims, looted their possessions and set their houses on fire. There was mass killing of Muslims in and around Jammu city. The state troops led the attacks. The state officials provided arms and ammunition to the rioters. The administration had demobilised many Muslim soldiers in the state army and had discharged Muslim police officers. Most of the Muslims outside the Muslim dominated areas were killed by the communal rioters who moved in vehicles with arms and ammunition, though the city was officially put under curfew. Many Gujjar men and women who used to supply milk to the city from the surrounding villages were reportedly massacred en route. It is said that the Ramnagar reserve in Jammu was littered with the dead bodies of Gujjar men, women and children. In the Muslim localities of Jammu city, Talab Khatikan and Mohalla Ustad, Muslims were surrounded and were denied water supply and food. The Muslims in Talab Khatikan area had joined to defend themselves with the arms they could gather, who later received support from the Muslim Conference. They were eventually asked to surrender and the administration asked them to go to Pakistan for their safety. These Muslims and others who wanted to go to Sialkot, in thousands, were loaded in numerous trucks and were escorted by the troops in the first week of November. When they reached the outskirts of the city, they were pulled out and killed by armed Sikhs and RSS men, while abducting the women.

There were also reports of large-scale massacres of Muslims in Udhampur district, particularly in proper Udhampur, Chenani, Ramnagar, Bhaderwah and Reasi areas. Killing of numerous Muslims was reported from Chhamb, Deva Batala, Manawsar and other parts of Akhnoor with many people fleeing to Pakistan or moving to Jammu. In Kathua district and Billawar area, there was extensive killing of Muslims with women being raped and abducted.

On 16 November 1947, Sheikh Abdullah arrived in Jammu and a refugee camp was set up in Mohalla Ustad.

Observations 

Mahatma Gandhi commented on the situation in Jammu on 25 December 1947 in his speech at a prayer meeting in New Delhi: "The Hindus and Sikhs of Jammu and those who had gone there from outside killed Muslims. The Maharaja of Kashmir is responsible for what is happening there…A large number of Muslims have been killed there and Muslim women have been dishonoured."

According to Ved Bhasin and scholar Ilyas Chattha, the Jammu riots were executed by members of the Rashtriya Swayamsevak Sangh (RSS) who were joined by the refugees from West Pakistan, and were supported strongly by Hari Singh and his administration with a main aim to change the demographic composition of Jammu region and ensure a non-Muslim majority. Bhasin states, the riots were "clearly" planned by the activists of RSS. Observers have noted that the Akali Sikhs and some former members of the Indian National Army (INA) also participated in this violence along with the RSS and state forces.

Bhasin says that the massacres took place in the presence of the then Jammu and Kashmir's Prime Minister Mehr Chand Mahajan and the governor of Jammu, Lala Chet Ram Chopra, and that some of those who led these riots in Udhampur and Bhaderwah later joined the National Conference with some of them also serving as ministers.

Estimates of people killed and displaced 
An early official calculation made in Pakistan, using headcount data, estimated 50,000 Muslims killed. A team of two Englishmen jointly commissioned by the governments of India and Pakistan investigated seven major incidents of violence between 20 October – 9 November 1947, estimating 70,000 deaths. Scholar Ian Copland estimated total deaths to be around 80,000, while Ved Bhasin estimated them to be around 100,000. Scholar Christopher Snedden says, the number of Muslims killed were between 20,000 and 100,000. Justice Yusuf Saraf estimates them to be between 20,000 and 30,000.

Much higher figures were reported by newspapers at that time. A report by a special correspondent of The Times, published on 10 August 1948, stated that a total of 237,000 Muslims were either killed or migrated to Pakistan. The editor of The Statesman Ian Stephens claimed that 500,000 Muslims, "the entire Muslim element of the population", was eliminated and 200,000 "just disappeared". Scholar Ian Copland finds these figures dubious.

The Pakistani newspaper Nawa-i-Waqt reported that more than 100,000 Jammu refugees had arrived in Sialkot by 20 November 1947. Snedden, on the other hand, cites a "comprehensive report" in Dawn, which said that 200,000 Muslims went as refugees to Pakistan in October–November 1947. An unidentified organisation in Pakistan counted refugees from Jammu and Kashmir during May–July 1949, and found 333,964 refugees from the Indian-held parts of the state. Of these, an estimated 100,000 refugees returned to their homes in 1949–1950, leaving an estimated 233,964 refugees in Pakistan. Based on the electoral rolls of Pakistan-administered Kashmir in 1970, the number that remained in Pakistan is estimated to be in the range 219,718 – 259,047.

Violence against Hindus and Sikhs in Rajouri and Mirpur 
Muslims in the western districts of Poonch jagir began an agitation against taxes in mid-1947, which escalated into an armed rebellion against Hari Singh's government, and expanded to Mirpur district. In October 1947, a force of Pathan tribesman crossed into Kashmir from Pakistan's North-West Frontier Province and the adjoining princely states and tribal areas. The rebels took control of most of the countryside in these districts by the end of the month, driving non-Muslims to seek shelter in towns where the State troops were garrisoned. Beginning on 24 October, the towns themselves fell to the rebels: Bhimber (24 October), Rajauri (7 November), and Mirpur (25 November).

Rajouri 
Rajouri was held by the "Azad Kashmir forces", or rebels from Poonch, and the raiders, until April 1948, when the town was taken by the Indian armed forces. The town was surrounded by Muslim mobs who carried out extensive killings, loot and rapes of Hindu residents. The Hindus facing this persecution included the town's residents as well as refugees. Some Hindus were able to escape, while others were sheltered by sympathetic Muslims. Mass suicides and killings, including by beheading or poisoning, occurred among women, sometimes at the hands of men in their family. These were the result of fears that they would be sexually abused by the raiders. The capture of Rajouri from the raiders is commemorated on 13 April, and a monument honoring the incident was erected in the town.

Mirpur 
After the Indian army repelled the Pashtun raiders from near Srinagar on 25 November, the raiders turned to Mirpur, in present-day Azad Kashmir. Political scientist Christopher Snedden writes of unverifiable allegations that 20,000 non-Muslims were killed on and shortly after 25 November in Mirpur, and a further 2500 were abducted. In the district of Mirpur and nearby regions of Poonch, Hindu and Sikh women were also raped and abducted. November 25 is now commemorated as "Mirpur Day" in Indian-administered Kashmir.

Population figures 
The table below compares the 1941 percentage of Muslim population with the present percentage for the Indian-administered part of the Jammu province and gives figures for estimated 'loss' of Muslims, due to deaths as well as migration.

Scholar Ian Copland tries to estimate how many Muslims might have been killed in the Jammu violence based on demographic data. If the headcount figure of 333,964 refugees from the Indian-administered parts of the state is used to calculate an estimate, one ends up with a surplus rather than a deficit. However, Justice Yusuf Saraf estimates that 100,000 Jammu refugees returned to their homes in 1949–1950. If we deduct this 100,000 from the original headcount figure, the estimate of Muslims killed would be a few tens of thousands.

The table below compares the 1941 percentage of 'Hindu & Sikh' population (H/S population) with that in 1951 for the areas of Pakistan-administered Azad Kashmir (comprising 89 per cent of the Mirpur District, 60 per cent of the Poonch Jagir and 87 per cent of the Muzaffarabad District).

See also 
Persecution of Muslims
Violence against Muslims in India
Timeline of the Kashmir conflict
Kashmir conflict
Partition of India

Notes

References

Bibliography

External links
 Khalid Bashir Ahmad, Jammu 1947: Tales of Bloodshed, Greater Kashmir, 5 November 2014.

Massacres in 1947
Anti-Muslim violence in India
Partition of India
Massacres in Jammu and Kashmir
October 1947 events in Asia
November 1947 events in Asia
Conflicts in 1947
Mass murder in 1947
1947 murders in India